Koy or KOY may refer to:

Koy (name), given name and surname
Koy (animal), intermediate between cattle and beast
KOY, commercial AM radio station in Phoenix, Arizona, U.S.
Kingdom of Yugoslavia, state in Southeast and Central Europe from 1918 until 1941

See also
Coy (disambiguation)
Koi (disambiguation)
Köy, the word for "village" in several Western Oghuz languages